Anne-Louis-Henri de La Fare (1752–1829) was a French Roman Catholic cardinal and counter-revolutionary.

References

1752 births
1829 deaths
18th-century French cardinals
19th-century French cardinals
Archbishops of Sens
Bishops of Nancy
French counter-revolutionaries
People of the Ancien Régime
Cardinals created by Pope Pius VII